Morocco participated in the 2010 Summer Youth Olympics in Singapore.

Medalists

Athletics

Boys
Track and Road Events

Field Events

Girls
Track and Road Events

Canoeing

Girls

Swimming

Zineb El Hazaz, while the flag bearer was not registered in a swimming event and therefore did not compete at the olympics.

References

External links
Competitors List: Morocco

2010 in Moroccan sport
Nations at the 2010 Summer Youth Olympics
Morocco at the Youth Olympics